Piotr Sebastian Zieliński (born 20 May 1994) is a Polish professional footballer who plays as a midfielder for  club Napoli and the Poland national team. During his senior career he has also played for Udinese and Empoli.

Zieliński was selected to represent Poland at UEFA Euro 2016 in France, as well as the 2018 FIFA World Cup in Russia, the pan-European UEFA Euro 2020, and the 2022 World Cup in Qatar. He has two brothers who are also professional footballers – Paweł and Tomasz Zieliński.

Club career

Early career
Zieliński started his career at his local club, Orzeł Ząbkowice Śląskie, where he was coached by his father. At the age of 14, he joined Zagłębie Lubin, even though he was wanted by Bayer Leverkusen and Liverpool and also had trials at Feyenoord and Hereenveen. He rose through the ranks and started training with the first team at the age of 15, under Franciszek Smuda.

At 17 he moved abroad to join Udinese Calcio after they scouted him on international youth tournament.

Udinese
Zieliński made his debut in Serie A on 2 November 2012 when he replaced Antonio Di Natale in 91st minute of a match against Cagliari.

Empoli (loan)
In 2014, Zieliński joined Empoli on loan.

Napoli

On 4 August 2016, after months of transfer speculation, Zieliński moved from Udinese to Napoli for a reported €16 million. He scored his first goal with Partenopei's shirt on 3 December, in a 3–0 home win against Inter Milan; he ended his first season with six goals. On 31 August 2020 he signed new contract with Napoli until 2024. On 31 October 2021, not only did he decide the derby between U.S. Salernitana 1919 and Napoli, scoring the only goal of the game, but with 32 goals he also became the second best Polish goal-scorer in Serie A's history (behind Arkadiusz Milik), beating Zbigniew Boniek's record. On 17 February 2022, he scored a goal for Napoli in a Europa League match against Barcelona which ended in a 1–1 draw. On 7 September 2022, he scored two goals and had one assist in a Champions League match against Liverpool F.C., which concluded in a 4–1 victory for Napoli.

International career

On 4 June 2013, Zieliński made his senior international debut for the Poland national team in a friendly match against Liechtenstein.

In May 2018, he was named in Poland’s preliminary 35-man squad for the 2018 World Cup in Russia.

Personal life
On 15 June 2019, Zieliński married Laura Słowiak with whom he has a son, Maksymilian (born 2021). In 2021, he passed an Italian language exam at the B2 level at the University of Naples in an effort to obtain Italian citizenship.

Career statistics

Club

International

Scores and results list Poland's goal tally first, score column indicates score after each Zieliński goal.

Honours

Napoli
 Coppa Italia: 2019–20

Poland U21
Four Nations Tournament: 2014–15

References

External links

Profile at the S.S.C. Napoli website

Living people
1994 births
People from Ząbkowice Śląskie
Sportspeople from Lower Silesian Voivodeship
Association football midfielders
Polish footballers
Polish expatriate footballers
Poland international footballers
Zagłębie Lubin players
Udinese Calcio players
Empoli F.C. players
S.S.C. Napoli players
Serie A players
Expatriate footballers in Italy
Polish expatriate sportspeople in Italy
Poland under-21 international footballers
Poland youth international footballers
UEFA Euro 2016 players
2018 FIFA World Cup players
UEFA Euro 2020 players
2022 FIFA World Cup players